The University Center is a 7,500-seat multi-purpose arena in Hammond, Louisiana, United States, on the campus Southeastern Louisiana University. Often called "the UC" within the university, it was built in 1982 at a cost of $16.3 million.

It is home to Southeastern Louisiana University's Lions and Lady Lions basketball teams and Lady Lions volleyball team. It also hosts many other functions including Southeastern's commencement, a variety of concerts and community events, circuses, and rodeos.

From 2001 through 2008, the arena hosted the girls basketball state championships tournament of the Louisiana High School Athletic Association; after a 1-year hiatus at a location on another campus, the tournament returned to Southeastern and to its University Center in 2010. The tournament is well received and supported in Hammond and Tangipahoa Parish, where girls basketball has been popular for many decades. Baylor coach Kim Mulkey starred at Hammond High School before a standout career at Louisiana Tech and as a member of the U.S. national team that won the gold medal at the 1984 Summer Olympics.

The arena floor measures ; the arena seats up to 8,961 for concerts.  Access to the university is via multilane LA 3234 (University Avenue) from I-55.

Gallery

See also
 List of convention centers in the United States
 List of NCAA Division I basketball arenas
 List of music venues

References

External links
Official page

Basketball venues in Louisiana
College basketball venues in the United States
College volleyball venues in the United States
Convention centers in Louisiana
Indoor arenas in Louisiana
Southeastern Louisiana Lions and Lady Lions basketball
Southeastern Louisiana Lady Lions volleyball
Sports venues in Hammond, Louisiana
Volleyball venues in Louisiana
Music venues in Louisiana
Buildings and structures in Tangipahoa Parish, Louisiana
1982 establishments in Louisiana
Sports venues completed in 1982